Carnet de Voyage is a 2004 graphic novel by cartoonist Craig Thompson.  The book is a combination of a travelogue and sketches that Thompson compiled while traveling through France, Barcelona, the Alps and Morocco, during a promotional tour for his earlier graphic novel Blankets.  Thompson also documents some of the research he did for his follow up  graphic novel, Habibi.  It was published by Top Shelf Productions.

External links

2004 graphic novels
Top Shelf Productions titles
Autobiographical graphic novels
Comics by Craig Thompson
Novels set in Barcelona
Comics set in France
Comics set in Spain
Comics set in Morocco